Leroy Paul (born May 5, 1957) is a Canadian football player who played professionally for the  Saskatchewan Roughriders, Hamilton Tiger-Cats, Toronto Argonauts and Ottawa Rough Riders.

References

1957 births
Texas Southern Tigers football players
Hamilton Tiger-Cats players
Saskatchewan Roughriders players
Ottawa Rough Riders players
Toronto Argonauts players
Canadian football defensive backs
Living people